is a municipal university in Japan. It is located in Hisayamada-cho, Onomichi City, Hiroshima Prefecture.

History 
In 1950 the school was developed into , a co-educational college, under Japan's new educational system.

At first the junior college had one department: the Department of Japanese Literature. In 1951 the Department of Economics was added. In 1962 it was removed to the present campus. In 1988 the Department of Business Administration and Information Science was added.

In 2001 the junior college was developed into Onomichi University, a four-year university with two faculties: the Faculty of Economics, Management & Information Science and the Faculty of Artistic Culture. In 2005 the Graduate Schools were added (Master's courses only). In April 2012 the university was incorporated as a public university corporation and renamed Onomichi City University.

Organization

Undergraduate schools 
 Faculty of Economics, Management & Information Science
 Faculty of Art and Culture
 Department of Japanese Literature
 Department of Art & Design

Graduate schools 
 Graduate School of Economics, Management & Information Science (Master's courses only)
 Graduate School of Japanese Literature (Master's courses only)
 Graduate School of Art & Design (Master's courses only)

Institutes 
 Library
 Center for Cooperative R&D
 Onomichi Shirakaba Museum of Art

References

External links 
 Official Website (Japanese and English)

Public universities in Japan
Universities and colleges in Hiroshima Prefecture